John Stearns (1951–2022) was an American baseball player and coach.

John Stearns may also refer to:
John Stearns (physician) (1770–1848), American physician
John Goddard Stearns Jr. (1843–1917), American architect
John O. Stearns (died 1910), American politician
Johnny Stearns (1916–2001), American actor, producer and director

See also
Jonathan Sterns (1751–1798), Loyalist
John Stearne (disambiguation)